The Paraná River is a river in south-central South America, running through Brazil, Paraguay, and Argentina for some . Among South American rivers, it is second in length only to the Amazon River. It merges with the Paraguay River and then farther downstream with the Uruguay River to form the Río de la Plata and empties into the Atlantic Ocean.

The first European to go up the Paraná River was the Venetian explorer Sebastian Cabot, in 1526, while working for Spain.

A drought hit the river in 2021, causing a 77-year low.

Etymology
In eastern South America there is "an immense number of river names containing the element para- or parana-", from Guarani language words meaning "river" or "sea"; attempts to derive a more precise meaning for the name of this, the largest of them, e.g. "kin of the sea", have been discounted.

Course 
The course is formed at the confluence of the Paranaiba and Rio Grande rivers in southern Brazil. From the confluence the river flows in a generally southwestern direction for about  before encountering the city of Saltos del Guaira, Paraguay. This was once the location of the Guaíra Falls (Sete Quedas waterfalls, where the Paraná fell over a series of seven cascades. This natural feature was said to rival the world-famous Iguazu Falls to the south. The falls were flooded, however, by the construction of the Itaipu Dam, which began operating in 1984.
For approximately the next  the Paraná flows southward and forms a natural boundary between Paraguay and Brazil until the confluence with the Iguazu River. Shortly upstream from this confluence, however, the river is dammed by the Itaipu Dam, the second largest hydroelectric power plant in the world (following the Three Gorges Dam in the People's Republic of China), and creating a massive, shallow reservoir behind it.

After merging with the Iguazu, the Paraná then becomes the natural border between Paraguay and Argentina. Overlooking the Paraná River from Encarnación, Paraguay, across the river, is downtown Posadas, Argentina. The river continues its general southward course for about  before making a gradual turn to the west for another , and then encounters the Paraguay River, the largest tributary along the course of the river. Before this confluence, the river passes through a second major hydroelectric project, the Yaciretá Dam, a joint project between Paraguay and Argentina. The massive reservoir formed by the project has been the source of a number of problems for people living along the river, most notably the poorer merchants and residents in the low-lying areas of Encarnación, a major city on the southern border of Paraguay. River levels rose dramatically upon completion of the dam, flooding out large sections of the city's lower areas.

From the confluence with the Paraguay River, the Paraná again turns to the south for another approximately  through Argentina, making a slow turn back to the east near the city of Rosario for the final stretch of less than  before merging with the Uruguay River to form the Río de la Plata. This flows into the Atlantic Ocean. During the part of its course downstream from the city of Diamante, Entre Ríos, it splits into several arms and it forms the Paraná Delta.

Uses
Together with its tributaries, the Rio Paraná forms a massive drainage basin that encompasses much of the southcentral part of South America, essentially including all of Paraguay, much of southern Brazil, northern Argentina, and the southeastern part of Bolivia. If the Uruguay River is counted as a tributary to the Paraná, this watershed extends to cover most of Uruguay as well. The volume of water flowing into the Atlantic Ocean through the Río de la Plata roughly equals the volume at the Mississippi River delta. This watershed contains a number of large cities, including São Paulo, Buenos Aires, Rosario, Asunción, Brasília, and La Plata.

The Paraná and its tributaries provide a source of income and of daily sustenance for fishermen who live along its banks. Some of the species of fish (such as the surubí and the sábalo) are commercially important, and they are exploited for heavy internal consumption or for export. The Parana River delta ranks as one of the world's greatest bird-watching destinations.

Much of the length of the Paraná is navigable, and the river serves as an important waterway linking inland cities in Argentina and Paraguay with the ocean, providing deepwater ports in some of these cities. The construction of enormous hydroelectric dams along the river's length has blocked its use as a shipping corridor to cities further upstream, but the economic impact of those dams offsets this. The Yacyretá Dam and the Itaipu Dam on the Paraguay border have made the small, largely undeveloped nation of Paraguay the world's largest exporter of hydroelectric power.

Due to its use for oceangoing ships, measurements of the water tables extend back to 1904. The data correlates with the Sun's solar cycle.

Gallery

Links across the Paraná
The course of the Paraná is crossed by the following bridges, beginning upstream:

See also
 Tributaries of the Río de la Plata
Paraná River steamers

References

External links

Information and a map of the Paraná's watershed
 

 
Rivers of Argentina
Rivers of São Paulo (state)
Rivers of Mato Grosso do Sul
Rivers of Paraná (state)
Rivers of Paraguay
Argentina–Paraguay border
Brazil–Paraguay border
International rivers of South America
Alto Paraná Department
Border rivers